Agonopterix thaiensis is a moth in the family Depressariidae. It was described by Hans-Joachim Hannemann in 1986. It is found in Thailand.

References

Moths described in 1986
Agonopterix
Moths of Asia